is a district located in Ishikawa Prefecture, Japan.

As of 2003, the district has an estimated population of 39,888 and a density of 111.35 persons per km2. The total area is 358.23 km2.

Towns and villages
The district has two towns:

 Hōdatsushimizu
 Shika

History

Recent mergers
 On March 1, 2005 - The towns of Oshimizu and Shio were merged to form the town of Hōdatsushimizu.
 On September 1, 2005 - The town of Togi was merged into the expanded town of Shika.

Districts in Ishikawa Prefecture